Excrescentia is a genus of midges in the family Cecidomyiidae. The are two described species are found in the Holarctic region.

Species
Excrescentia alleghenyensis Plakidas, 2017
Excrescentia mutuata Mamaev & Berest, 1991

References

Cecidomyiidae genera

Insects described in 1991
Taxa named by Boris Mamaev
Taxa named by Zoya L. Berest